Pseudoxytenanthera ritcheyi is a species of plant belonging to the genus Pseudoxytenanthera of the grass family, Poaceae. It is an Asian bamboo commonly called the "erankol". The species grows in wild in the  plains and foothills of South Indian regions.

Description
Pseudoxytenanthera ritcheyi is a type of bamboo and its solid stem is very strong. It is grown as a building material.

References

Flora of Asia
Bambusoideae